Two ships of the Royal Navy have been named HMS Campanula :

  an  sloop launched in 1915 and sold in 1922
 , a  launched in 1940 and scrapped in 1947

Royal Navy ship names